"Long as I Live" is a song written by Rick Bowles and Will Robinson, and recorded by American country music artist John Michael Montgomery.  It was released in February 1996 as the fifth and final single from the album John Michael Montgomery.  The song reached number 4 on the Billboard Hot Country Singles & Tracks chart.

Critical reception
Larry Flick, of Billboard magazine reviewed the song negatively saying that it sounds too much like territory he has covered before. He does state that Montgomery has "quite the flair for delivering positive love ballads."

Chart performance
"Long as I Live" debuted at number 57 on the U.S. Billboard Hot Country Singles & Tracks for the week of March 2, 1996.

Year-end charts

References

1996 singles
1995 songs
John Michael Montgomery songs
Song recordings produced by Scott Hendricks
Songs written by Rick Bowles
Songs written by Will Robinson (songwriter)
Atlantic Records singles